Jesus is the debut EP by Arizona punk band the Feederz. It was recorded cheaply in their home state of Arizona and released on 1980 through Anxiety Records. It was reissued in 1983 on Placebo Records with a different sleeve. The EP generally received positive reviews. The title track (with the expanded title "Jesus Entering from the Rear") later appeared on the classic Let Them Eat Jellybeans! compilation, issued in 1981 on Alternative Tentacles. Later band releases are simply credited to "Feederz".

Track listing

"Jesus"  – 3:07
"Stop You’re Killing Me" – 1:53 
"Avon Lady" – 1:38 
"Terrorist" – 3:04

References

External links
 DISCOGRAPHY
 at Discogs
  Alternative Tentacles

1980 EPs